Caroline Mani (born 18 January 1987) is a French cyclo-cross racing cyclist. A five-time French National Champion, she won the silver medal at the 2016 UCI Cyclo-cross World Championships in Zolder, Belgium.  Caroline has been one of the more consistent performers in the world and domestic American cyclocross circuits amassing dozens of podium finishes.  She won the 2021 and 2022 USCX Series titles.

External links

1987 births
Living people
French female cyclists
Cyclo-cross cyclists
Sportspeople from Besançon
Cyclists from Bourgogne-Franche-Comté